This article lists all the confirmed national football squads for the UEFA Women's Euro 2005.

Players marked (c) were named as captain for their national squad.

Group A

Head coach:  Peter Bonde

Head coach:  Hope Powell

Head coach:  Michael Käld

Head coach:  Marika Domanski Lyfors

The final squad was announced by Marika Domanski Lyfors.

Sweden caps and goals based on compilation of match reports at https://www.svenskfotboll.se/landslag/dam/landskamper-2001-2010/

Group B

Head coach:  Élisabeth Loisel

Head coach:  Tina Theune-Meyer

Head coach:  Carolina Morace

Head coach:  Bjarne Berntsen

References

External links
 European Women Championship 2005 - Match Details at RSSSF.com

Squads
2005